Planet Earth is a television soundtrack album of incidental music commissioned by the BBC Natural History Unit for its 2006 nature documentary series of the same name. The music was composed and conducted by award-winning composer George Fenton, and performed by the BBC Concert Orchestra. Fenton had previously composed scores for several BBC wildlife series, among them Life in the Freezer, The Trials of Life and the predecessor to Planet Earth, The Blue Planet.

In 2007, the score for the opening episode "From Pole to Pole" won George Fenton an Emmy Award for Outstanding Music Composition for a Series. It was his second win, matching the success of The Blue Planet score five years earlier.

Fenton went on to compose the soundtrack for the feature film spin-off from the television series, Earth, and recorded it with the Berliner Philharmoniker.

Track listing 

The Planet Earth soundtrack spans two CDs, the division between the discs mirroring the two parts of the series broadcast in spring and autumn 2006 on British television. The opening song is "The Time has Come" composed by Epic Score.

Disc 1

Disc 2

External links 
 Review at Soundtrack.net

Television soundtracks
2006 soundtrack albums
BBC Records soundtracks
Planet Earth (franchise)
EMI Records soundtracks